The Brownsville Herald is a newspaper based in Brownsville, Texas, circulating in the Cameron County area.

Jesse O. Wheeler, a newspaperman from Victoria, purchased Brownsville's Cosmopolitan newspaper in 1892 and renamed it the Brownsville Herald. In early years, the paper voiced concern for the need of a railroad connection to the north and a bridge to the nearby city of Matamoros, Mexico. A bridge opened in 1910.

It was owned by Freedom Communications until 2012, after Freedom filed for bankruptcy. Its papers in Texas — the Herald, Odessa American, Valley Morning Star of Harlingen, El Nuevo Heraldo, The Monitor of McAllen, The Mid Valley Town Crier of Weslaco, Coastal Current of South Padre Island and a variety of other weekly and monthly publications — were sold to AIM Media Texas.

References

External links

 
 Brownsville Herald digital edition
 Official mobile site
 "Brownsville Herald"  hosted by the Portal to Texas History.

Daily newspapers published in Texas
Mass media in Brownsville, Texas